The flag of City of Kutaisi, Georgia, is rectangular in proportion 2/3. Field of a flag is divided and crossed 1/4 part a field green, 2/3 - dark blue. In center of a flag is represented heraldry a cross in corners four by small crosses.  The designer of flag of Kutaisi is Mamuka Gongadze.

Color description
Gold - Symbol of nobleness and magnificence.
Green - Symbol of freedom and hope.
Dark Blue - Symbol of advantage and greatness.

References
The State Council of Heraldry at the Parliament of Georgia

Kutaisi
Kutaisi
Kutaisi
Kutaisi